Events from the year 1986 in Canada.

Incumbents

Crown 
 Monarch – Elizabeth II

Federal government 
 Governor General – Jeanne Sauvé
 Prime Minister – Brian Mulroney
 Chief Justice – Brian Dickson (Manitoba)
 Parliament – 33rd

Provincial governments

Lieutenant governors 
Lieutenant Governor of Alberta – Helen Hunley   
Lieutenant Governor of British Columbia – Robert Gordon Rogers 
Lieutenant Governor of Manitoba – Pearl McGonigal (until December 11) then George Johnson 
Lieutenant Governor of New Brunswick – George Stanley
Lieutenant Governor of Newfoundland – William Anthony Paddon (until September 5) then James McGrath 
Lieutenant Governor of Nova Scotia – Alan Abraham 
Lieutenant Governor of Ontario – Lincoln Alexander 
Lieutenant Governor of Prince Edward Island – Lloyd MacPhail 
Lieutenant Governor of Quebec – Gilles Lamontagne 
Lieutenant Governor of Saskatchewan – Frederick Johnson

Premiers 
Premier of Alberta – Don Getty  
Premier of British Columbia – Bill Bennett (until August 6) then Bill Vander Zalm 
Premier of Manitoba – Howard Pawley 
Premier of New Brunswick – Richard Hatfield
Premier of Newfoundland – Brian Peckford 
Premier of Nova Scotia – John Buchanan 
Premier of Ontario – David Peterson 
Premier of Prince Edward Island – James Lee (until May 2) then Joe Ghiz 
Premier of Quebec – Robert Bourassa 
Premier of Saskatchewan – Grant Devine

Territorial governments

Commissioners 
 Commissioner of Yukon –  Douglas Bell (until March 27) then  John Kenneth McKinnon 
 Commissioner of Northwest Territories – John Havelock Parker

Premiers 
Premier of the Northwest Territories – Nick Sibbeston 
Premier of Yukon – Tony Penikett

Events

January to June
January 22 – An investigation determines that a bomb caused the crash of Air India flight 182.
January 31 – The Canadian dollar hits an all-time low of 70.2 U.S. cents on international money markets.
February 8 – Hinton train collision: 23 people are killed when a Via Rail train collides with a Canadian National Railway train near Hinton, Alberta.
May 1 – Shirley Carr becomes the first female head of the Canadian Union of Public Employees.
May 2
Joe Ghiz becomes premier of Prince Edward Island, replacing James Lee.
The 1986 World Exposition (Expo 86) in Vancouver opens.
May 8 – Alberta election: Don Getty's PCs win a fifth consecutive majority, but a smaller majority than before.
May 9 – Roger Coles resigns as leader of Yukon Liberal Party and MLA for Tatchun after being arrested and charged with selling cocaine to an undercover police officer.
May 25 – In Vancouver an attempt is made to assassinate Malkiat Singh Sidhu, a cabinet minister in the Indian state of Punjab.
June 14 – An accident involving the Mindbender roller coaster at West Edmonton Mall kills three people and seriously injures a fourth.
June 19 – The new Competition Act comes into force.
June 20 – Jean Drapeau resigns as mayor of Montreal.

July to December
August 5 - Canada adopts sanctions against South Africa for its apartheid policies
August 6 - Bill Vander Zalm becomes premier of British Columbia, replacing Bill Bennett
August 11 - Tamil refugees are found drifting off the coast of Newfoundland
September 16 - Elizabeth II augments the Coat of Arms of Saskatchewan with a crest and supporters
September 30 - MPs elect the Speaker by secret ballot for the first time.
October 6 - Canada receives a United Nations award for sheltering refugees
October 20 - Saskatchewan election: Grant Devine's PCs win a second consecutive majority
November 13 - The announcement that the film producer Claude Jutra was reported missing for over one week. He had started to suffer the first symptoms of the Alzheimer's disease.
December 8 - The University of Toronto's John C. Polanyi shares the Nobel Prize for chemistry for the development of the chemical laser.

Full date unknown
Negotiators begin work on what would eventually be the Canada-United States Free Trade Agreement
The birds series of Canadian banknotes is released
Supreme Court rules on the RWDSU v. Dolphin Delivery Ltd. case
Conrad Black buys The Daily Telegraph
Dinosaur fossils are found near Parrsboro, Nova Scotia

Arts and literature

New works
Margaret Atwood - Freeforall
W.P. Kinsella - The Fence Post Chronicles
Robert Munsch - Love You Forever
Alice Munro - The Progress of Love
Antonine Maillet - Garrochés en paradis
Hugh Hood - The Motor Boys in Ottawa
William Gibson - Count Zero

Awards
See 1986 Governor General's Awards for a complete list of winners and finalists for those awards.
Books in Canada First Novel Award: Wayne Johnston, The Story of Bobby O'Mally
Gerald Lampert Award: Joan Fern Shaw, Raspberry Vinegar
Marian Engel Award: Alice Munro
Pat Lowther Award: Erín Moure, Domestic Fuel
Stephen Leacock Award: Joey Slinger, No Axe too Small to Grind
Vicky Metcalf Award: Dennis Lee

New music
Leonard Cohen - First We Take Manhattan
Neil Young - Landing on Water

New movies
James Cameron's Aliens is released
David Cronenberg's The Fly
Denys Arcand's The Decline of the American Empire

Sport
March 15 – In an international women's field hockey match at Wembley Stadium (England) Canada beats England 3 – 1.
May 17 – The Guelph Platers win their only Memorial Cup by defeating the Hull Olympiques 6 to 2. 
May 24 – The Montreal Canadiens win their 23rd Stanley Cup by defeating the Calgary Flames. The deciding Game 5 is played at Olympic Saddledome in Calgary
June 1 - Canada participates in the FIFA World Cup for the first, and to date only, time.
November 22 – The UBC Thunderbirds win their second championship by defeating the Western Ontario Mustangs by a score of 25–23.
November 30 – Hamilton Tiger-Cats win their 7th Grey Cup by defeating the Edmonton Eskimos 39 to 15 in the 74th Grey Cup played at BC Place Stadium in Vancouver

Unknown date 
The Canadian Amateur Football Association is renamed Football Canada.
Montreal Concordes are re-branded as the "new" Montreal Allouettes

Births
January 8 – Jaclyn Linetsky, actress (d. 2003)
January 20 – Krystina Alogbo, water polo player
February 13 – Matthew Hawes, swimmer
February 19 – Jayde Nicole, model
April 4 – Cam Barker, ice hockey defenceman
April 8 - Jevohn Shepherd, basketball player
April 21 – Kevin Graham, water polo player
April 28 – Brandon Jung, water polo player
May 12 – Emily VanCamp, actress
May 31 – Melissa McIntyre, actress
June 5 – Amanda Crew, actress
June 18 – Meaghan Rath, actress
July 16 – Dustin Boyd, ice hockey player
July 19 – Jinder Mahal, pro wrestler
August 19 – Marie-Christine Schmidt, canoeist
August 20 – Linus Sebastian, youtuber
August 29 – Lauren Collins, actress
September 8 – Leah LaBelle, singer (d. 2018)
September 19 – Carrie Finlay, voice actor
November 4 – Alexz Johnson, singer-songwriter, actress, and philanthropist
November 5 – Heather Purnell, artistic gymnast
November 8 – Kaniehtiio Horn, actress  
December 7 – Corey Vidal, online video content provider and digital media consultant
December 12 – Marie-Pier Beaudet, archer
December 16 – Scott Tupper, field hockey player
December 19 – Annie Murphy, actress

Deaths

January to June

January 4 - Wilbur R. Franks, scientist and inventor (b. 1901)
January 26 - Norman MacKenzie, author, lawyer, professor and Senator (b. 1894)
February 23 - Louis-Philippe Pigeon, judge of the Supreme Court of Canada (b. 1905)
February 24 - Tommy Douglas, politician and Premier of Saskatchewan (b. 1904)
February 27 - Jacques Plante, ice hockey player (b. 1929)
March 4 - Richard Manuel, composer, singer and multi-instrumentalist (b. 1943)
March 4 - Elizabeth Smart, poet and novelist (b. 1913)
June 13 - Wilfrid Eggleston, journalist and chief censor for Canada from 1942 until 1944 (b. 1901)

July to December
July 25 - Alison Parrott, murder victim (b. 1974)
August 20 - Milton Acorn, poet, writer and playwright (b. 1923)
November 5 - Claude Jutra, actor, film director and writer (b. 1930)
November 10 - King Clancy, ice hockey player (b. 1903)
November 19 - Don Jamieson, politician, diplomat and broadcaster (b. 1921)
December 31 - Donald Fleming, politician, International Monetary Fund official and lawyer (b. 1905)

See also
 1986 in Canadian television
 List of Canadian films of 1986

References 

 
Years of the 20th century in Canada
Canada
1986 in North America